The 1987 International ADAC 1000 km Rennen was the eighth round of the 1987 World Sports-Prototype Championship.  It took place at the Nürburgring, West Germany on August 30, 1987.

Official results
Class winners in bold.  Cars failing to complete 75% of the winner's distance marked as Not Classified (NC).

† - #111 Spice Engineering was disqualified following the race after it was discovered that the car had received a push start during a pit stop.

Statistics
 Pole Position - #15 Britten – Lloyd Racing - 1:25.430
 Fastest Lap - #9 Joest Racing - 1:29.510
 Average Speed - 182.675 km/h

References

 
 

Nurburgring
Nurburgring
6 Hours of Nürburgring